Chris Reed is a competitive shooter known for being the winner of the second season of History Channel's marksmen competition Top Shot. He also competed in the Field & Stream's Total Outdoorsman Challenge for 5 years, finishing in the top 3 four times. Since winning Top Shot, Reed has gone on to participate in long range tactical rifle competitions. His best finish was at the PRS in Tehachapi, CA in 2015 where he won the Mid East Regional Championship.

Background

Reed was born in Mississippi. He lives in Grenada, Mississippi, and works as a realtor and also runs his own bulldozing company. Reed has two children and has been married for 21 years. At one point, he had brain surgery.

In 2009, Reed finished second at the Field & Stream's Total Outdoorsman Challenge. That same year, he was the national champion in both 12-gauge Sporting Clays and 22 Long Rifle. In 2010, he was the finalist in National Rifle, Shotgun and Archery. He has also won several state and national championships in both archery and long rifle.

Reed is a Marine Corps honor graduate and Company High Shooter.

Top Shot

In 2011, Reed appeared in the second season of History Channel's marksmen competition Top Shot. During the first half of the competition, Reed competed as part of the Red Team. His team ended up winning six challenges, and Reed was never nominated for elimination during that period. During the final half of the competition, Reed won one of the last individual challenges before the final. In the finale, he beat Brian Zins to win the competition as well as $100,000.

During one episode of the third season of the show, Reed appeared with Season 1 winner, Iain Harrison, serving as honorary team captains of the two current Blue and Red teams for one of the challenges. A $5,000 donation was made to a charity selected by the captain of the winning team, and Reed chose the Make-A-Wish Foundation. His team won the challenge. Reed appeared again as a trainer during the fourth season of the show.

References

External links
Chris Reed Bio on History Channel

American real estate brokers
American male sport shooters
Living people
Participants in American reality television series
People from Franklin, Tennessee
People from Grenada, Mississippi
Year of birth missing (living people)